"Hooray" is an exclamation of cheering.

Hooray may also refer to:

Hooray for Boobies, a Bloodhound Gang album, released in censored forms as simply Hooray
Hooray (horse) (born 2008), a British thoroughbred racehorse
"Hooray", a song by Delays from their 2008 album Everything's the Rush
Hurray (game)

See also

Hip Hip Hurray (disambiguation)